Arvind Gupta is an Indian toy inventor, author, translator and scientist. He got the civilian award "Padma Shree" on the eve of Republic Day, 2018.

Career 
A graduate from IIT Kanpur (1975 batch), Arvind Kumar Gupta took a year's study leave from TELCO (in 1978) to work with the grassroots village science teaching programme for children in the tribal district of Hoshangabad, Madhya Pradesh called Hoshangabad Science Teaching Programme. While there, he developed many useful low-cost teaching/science teaching aids using locally available materials. The possibilities of using ordinary things for doing science and recycling modern junk into joyous products appealed immensely to children. 

Arvind Gupta's first book, Matchstick Models and other Science Experiments, was translated into 12 Indian languages by various Popular Science groups and sold more than half a million copies. Gupta has conducted workshops in over 2000 schools and has won many national and international awards.
As a student in the 1970 s in Indian Institute of Technology, Kanpur, Gupta became a socialist in belief but eschewed action-less discourse; he stated that instead he "placed more faith in small positive action than empty rhetoric." Gupta began his social service by teaching the children of the mess staff who had no opportunities for formal education.

Gandhian in outlook, Arvind Gupta participated in the Hoshangabad Science Teaching Programme (HSTP) in Madhya Pradesh in 1978. While he was there he developed his idea of creating simple toys and educational experiments using locally available materials as well as items usually thrown as trash. These simple toys, he found, fascinated children and Gupta went on to make these as the hallmark of his movement of popularising science. His first book, "Matchstick Models and other Science Experiments" was reprinted in 12 languages. Gupta's website holds instructions, including short video clips on YouTube, in a number of languages, for making hundreds of improvised toys, which he makes available freely without copyright restrictions. Gupta draws inspiration from a number of people, including Gautama Buddha, George Washington Carver and his mother.

His popular TED Talk: Turning Trash into Toys for learning gives an insight into his work and philosophy. His talk was among the 10 best TED talks compiled by Sir Ken Robinson and Sugata Mitra's 5 favorite education talks.

Selected awards and recognition
He has won several awards for his lifelong efforts at popularizing science and in designing teaching aids for young children.
These include:

 Dr. Narendra Dabholkar Memorial Award by the Maharashtra Foundation (2018).
 Distinguished Math Teacher's Award, Association of Maths Teachers of India (AMTI) (2016).
 The Dadhichi Award given by The Education Society, Ambarnath, Maharashtra (2012).
 Sri Chandrasekarendra Saraswati National Eminence Award conferred by the South Indian Education Society, Mumbai (2010).
 The TWAS (Third World Academy of Sciences) Regional Prize for Public Understanding and Popularization of Science (2010).
 The C. N. R. Rao Education Foundation Prize for Outstanding Science Teachers (2010).
 One-India One-People Award, conferred by the One-India, One-People Foundation, Mumbai (2009).
 The Indira Gandhi Award for Science Popularization conferred by INSA(2008).
 Prof. G. D. Parikh Memorial Award, conferred by the M.N. Roy Humanist Center for distinguished contributions in education (2004).
 The Distinguished Alumnus Award from IIT Kanpur in 2001
 National Association for the Blind Award, for designing appropriate teaching aids for pre-school visually impaired children (1991).
 The inaugural National Award for Science Popularization among Children conferred by the DST, Government of India (1988).

Bibliography
 Wonders from toys (2015) - Scholastic, India. Illustrated by Reshma Barve.
 Women on Wheels (2015) - Graphic Novel, Manovikas. Illustrated by Ishita Dharap.
 Hands-On Maths (2014) - Scholastic, India. Illustrated by Reshma Barve.
 Fun with Leaves (2014) - Scholastic, India. Illustrated by Dr. Vidula Mhaiskar.
 Sci Fun (2013) - Scholastic, India. Illustrated by Reshma Barve.
 Toys from Trash (2013) - Scholastic, India. Illustrated by Reshma Barve.
 Thumbs Down (2012) - Scholastic, India. Fun with Thumbprints. Illustrated by Dr. Vidula Mhaiskar.
 Amazing Activities (2012) - Scholastic, India. Illustrated by Reshma Barve.
 The Story of Solar Energy (2011) - Scholastic, India. Illustrated by Reshma Barve.
 Science from Scrap (2010) - Scholastic, India. Illustrated by Chinmayee Samant.
 Bright Sparks (2009)- Illustrated by Dr. Karen Haydock. Published by (INSA) - Platinum Jubilee Celebrations.
 Science Skills & Thrills (2008) - Published by Kerala State Institute of Children's Literature.
 Quick Science (2009) - Scholastic India.
 Odds & Ends (2009) - Scholastic India.
 Aha! Activities (2006) - Published by Eklavya, Bhopal (www.eklavya.in)
 Hands-On (2002) Published by Vigyan Prasar.
 String Games (2002) - Illustrated by Avinash Deshpande. Published by National Book Trust.
 Ten Little Fingers (2000) - Illustrated by Avinash Deshpande. Published by National Book Trust.
 Little Toys (1996) - Illustrated by Avinash Deshpande. Published by National Book Trust.
 Toy Treasures (1993) - Illustrated by Avinash Deshpande. Published by Eklavya (www.eklavya.in)
 Toy Joy (1992) - Published by Vigyan Prasar.
 Pumps from the Dump - (1992) Published by Vigyan Prasar.
 Leaf Zoo (1992) - Published by Vigyan Prasar.
 The Toy Bag (1991) - Illustrated by Avinash Deshpande. Published by Eklavya (www.eklavya.in)
 Tangrams (1990) Published by Balsahiti, Hyderabad.
 Little Science (1989) - Illustrated by Avinash Deshpande. Published by Eklavya (www.eklavya.in)
 Matchstick Models & other Science Experiments (1987) - Illustrated by Avinash Deshpande. Translated into 13 Indian languages. Published by Eklavya (www.eklavya.in)

Translation in Hindi
Arvind Gupta has translated over 290 books to Hindi.

References

External links
 Arvind Gupta's website for popularizing science through children's toys
 Book about Arvind Gupta by Shobha Bhagwat published by Kaja Kaja Maru Publication (a publication of Garware Balbhavan Pune)
 Citation for "Distinguished Alumnus Award" from Indian Institute of Technology Kanpur in 2001
 Make Digital magazine's feature "Toys from Trash" on Arvind Gupta and his work
 TED Talk given by Arvind Gupta at The INK Conference
 Why I write? Arvind Gupta plays with the words of science
 Arvind Gupta Filmmaker Director&founder of purple flicks @purpleflicks.official, Traveler/Creator/Thinker/scuba diver, www.purpleflicks.com

Living people
Year of birth missing (living people)
20th-century Indian inventors
Indian popular science writers
IIT Kanpur alumni
20th-century Indian non-fiction writers
21st-century Indian non-fiction writers
20th-century Indian educators
Indian children's writers
21st-century Indian inventors
Indian social sciences writers
Translators from Hindi
20th-century Indian translators
21st-century Indian translators
Recipients of the Padma Shri in literature & education